The Tetraphytina (Cavalier-Smith 2008) or 'core Chlorophyta' are a proposed derived Chlorophyta clade. The basal Tetraphytina clades are the Pedinophyceae and the Chlorophytina.

Below is a cladogram based on Leliaert et al.

References

Chlorophyta